Favorite Fix is the debut full-length album by American power pop band Artist vs. Poet, which was released on March 2, 2010. It was released through Fearless Records.

Favorite Fix, produced by Mike Green (Paramore, Breathe Carolina, The Matches), Zack Odom and Kenneth Mount (All Time Low, Every Avenue, Hit the Lights), is the follow-up release to the band's third EP Damn Rough Night, and the EP's title track is featured on the album. It is the second Artist vs. Poet album to be sold both digitally and physically, alongside the band's self-titled 2008 EP. Favorite Fix features Forever the Sickest Kids bassist Austin Bello on vocals for the track "Damn Rough Night", and The Maine's John O'Callaghan collaborating on "Car Crash".

Track listing

Chart performance 
Favorite Fix reached #17 on the Billboard Heatseekers chart.

Personnel 

 Tarcy Thomason - lead vocals
 Craig Calloway - guitar, backing vocals
 Joe Kirkland - guitar, backing vocals
 Jason Dean - bass guitar
 Joe Westbrook - drums
 Zack Odom - producer
 Kenneth Mount - producer
 Mike Green - producer

References

External links 
 Artist vs. Poet on MySpace
 Artist vs. Poet on Fearless Records

2010 albums
Artist vs. Poet albums